Loose, Loud, & Crazy is the third studio album by the American country music singer Kevin Fowler, and his fourth album overall. It was his first album for Equity Music Group, a label started by the country music singer Clint Black. The album produced three singles: "Ain't Drinkin' Anymore", "Hard Man to Love" and "Don't Touch My Willie". The first single peaked at #49 on the Hot Country Singles & Tracks (now Hot Country Songs) chart, while the latter two failed to chart. Fowler wrote or co-wrote all but one of the songs on the album.

"The Lord Loves the Drinkin' Man" was later recorded by Mark Chesnutt on his 2004 album, Savin' the Honky Tonk, from which it was a Top 40 single on the country charts that same year.

Track listing
"Loose, Loud, & Crazy" (Bart Butler, Kevin Fowler, Jamie Richards) - 3:25
"Get Along" (Fowler, Mike Geiger) - 2:44
"Hard Man to Love" (Fowler, Bobby Pinson) - 4:02
"Ain't Drinkin' Anymore" (Fowler) - 2:55
"Political Incorrectness" (Roger Brown, Fowler) - 3:38
duet with Mark Chesnutt
"A Matter of When" (Fowler, Thom Shepherd) - 3:54
"Long Neckin' (Makes for Short Memories)" (Casey Beathard, Marla Cannon-Goodman, Michael P. Heeney) - 3:25
"Triple Clowns" (Fowler, Bobby Pounds, Greg Whitfield) - 2:44
"Half" (Billy Applegate, Fowler) - 3:39
"I'll Try Anything Twice" (Fowler) - 4:03
"The Lord Loves the Drinkin' Man" (Fowler) - 4:06
"Don't Touch My Willie" (Fowler, Pounds, Holly Watson) - 4:25
live recording

Personnel
 Ponty Bone - accordion
 John Carroll - electric guitar
 Mark Chesnutt - duet vocals on "Political Incorrectness"
 Tommy Detamore - steel guitar
 Dan Dreeben - drums
 Bobby Flores - fiddle
 Kevin Fowler - lead vocals
 Wes Hightower - background vocals
 Jason Roberts - fiddle
 John Wesley Ryles - background vocals
 John Michael Whitby - piano
 Greg Whitfield - acoustic guitar

Chart performance

References
[ Loose Loud & Crazy] at Allmusic

2004 albums
Kevin Fowler albums
Equity Music Group albums
Albums produced by Billy Joe Walker Jr.